François Raphael Hugues Hapipi (born 10 March 1999) is a footballer who last played as a defender for Urania. Born in France, he is a Tahiti international.

Career
Hapipi began his football career in 2008 and spent one season with hometown club ASC Pessac Alouette. The following year he joined FCE Mérignac Arlac where he stayed until 2012. He then spent one season in the academy of 
Ligue 1 club FC Girondins de Bordeaux before returning to Mérignac Arlac in 2013.

Hapipi started his career with French fifth tier side Mérignac-Arlac. In 2021, he signed for Urania in the Croatian third tier.

In February 2022 he was selected for the Tahiti national football team for the  2022 FIFA World Cup qualifiers in Qatar.

References

External links
 

1999 births
Association football defenders
Championnat National 3 players
Second Football League (Croatia) players
Expatriate footballers in Croatia
French expatriate footballers
French expatriate sportspeople in Croatia
French footballers
Living people
Tahiti international footballers
French Polynesian expatriate footballers
French Polynesian footballers